Rotterdam, the second most populous city in the Netherlands, is home to over 350 completed high-rises. The 59 storey skyscraper also stands as the highest building in the Netherlands and the Benelux. It surpassed the former tallest building, Maastoren, which rises .

Rotterdam is well known as the high-rise city of the Netherlands. The city is therefore often called "Manhattan at the Meuse", because of the large number of skyscrapers standing close to the river Meuse, especially at Kop van Zuid. Rotterdam has a rich history in high-rises, dating back to 1897 with the completion of "Het Witte Huis". Rotterdam is famous for its characteristic skyline, and its world-wide reputation for innovative architecture.
The city stands in the European SkylineTop together with Frankfurt, Milan, London, Madrid, Paris, Warsaw and Moscow. Over 30 new high-rise projects were being developed in the early 2020s.

Buildings
The listed heights are the constructive heights of the building. Architectonic and functional masts are only shown here for comparison.

Future tall buildings

See also
 List of tallest buildings in the Netherlands
 List of tallest structures in the Netherlands
 List of tallest buildings in Amsterdam
 List of tallest buildings in Haaglanden

References

Rotterdam